The southern moray (Gymnothorax austrinus) is a moray eel found in the eastern Indian Ocean, around Victoria, Australia. It was first named by Böhlke and McCosker in 2001. It lives in moderate-temperature, marine habitat; it is a demersal fish. The maximum length discovered was a female at 88.2 cm long.

References

austrinus
Fish described in 2001